The Jeunesse Athlétique Club de Port-Gentil or simply JAC Port-Gentil is a Gabonese football club based in Port-Gentil, Ogooué-Maritime province. They play in the Gabon Championnat National D2.

History
The club was named on past as AS OPRAG Port-Gentil. In 1989, it change the name to JAC Port-Gentil.
In 1990 the team has won the Gabon Championnat National D1.

Achievements
Gabon Championnat National D1: 1
 1990

Stadium
Currently the team plays at the Stade Pierre Claver Divounguy.

References

External links

Football clubs in Gabon